Sunrise Mountain is a peak of the Kittatinny Mountains in Sussex County, New Jersey, United States. It lies along the Appalachian Trail in Stokes State Forest.

The crest of Sunrise Mountain is one of the most frequently visited sites in Stokes State Forest. The thin soil and harsh climate characteristic of Sunrise Mountain is a difficult environment in which few plants can survive. Mountain laurel, blueberry, pitch pine and bear oak are among the natural vegetation found throughout the area. The pavilion at the summit was built in the late 1930s by the Civilian Conservation Corps.

References

Notes

External links
Stokes State Forest

Mountains of New Jersey
Kittatinny Mountains
Mountains of Sussex County, New Jersey
Papakating Creek watershed